Brachylabis is a genus of earwigs in the subfamily Brachylabinae. It was cited by Srivastava in Part 2 of Fauna of India. It was also cited at an earlier date by Steinmann in his publication, The Animal Kingdom in 1986, 1989, 1990, and 1993, and by Chen & Ma in Fauna Sinica in 2004.

References

External links 
 The Earwig Research Centre's Brachylabis database Source for references: type Brachylabis in the "genus" field and click "search".

Insects of Asia
Anisolabididae
Dermaptera genera